Carnhot is a hamlet in the civil parish of Chacewater in Cornwall, England. Carnot is just to the south of the A30 road. 

Carnhot lies within Cornwall and West Devon Mining Landscape which is a World Heritage Site.

References

Hamlets in Cornwall